George Sweet (1844 – 1920) was an English-born Australian geologist, president of the Royal Society of Victoria in 1905.

Sweet investigated fossils in the Mansfield district for Frederick McCoy 1888-95, and was second-in-command to Sir Edgeworth David on the Funafuti expedition in 1897. He was a fellow of the Geological Society

Sweet's daughter, Georgina Sweet (1875–1946), became a zoologist and philanthropist.

References
Monica MacCallum, 'Sweet, George (1844 - 1920)', Australian Dictionary of Biography, Volume 12, MUP, 1990, pp 149–150.
Sweet, George (1844 - 1920) at Bright Sparcs, University of Melbourne

1844 births
1920 deaths
Australian geologists
Australian people of English descent